Dubna is a rural locality (a village) in Krasnoplamenskoye Rural Settlement, Alexandrovsky District, Vladimir Oblast, Russia. The population was 6 as of 2010. There is 1 street.

Geography 
Konyukhovo is the nearest rural locality.

References 

Rural localities in Alexandrovsky District, Vladimir Oblast